Mamta Kulkarni is a former Indian actress and model known for her work in Hindi cinema. She has appeared in commercial successful Hindi films such as Aashiq Awara (1993), Waqt Hamara Hai (1993), Krantiveer (1994), Karan Arjun (1995), Sabse Bada Khiladi (1995),
Andolan (1995), Baazi (1996), China Gate (1998) and Chhupa Rustam: A Musical Thriller (2001). Her performance in Aashiq Awara (1993) won her the 1994 Filmfare Award for Lux New Face of the Year. In the blockbuster Karan Arjun (1995), directed by Rakesh Roshan, Kulkarni starred alongside Salman Khan. She quit the film industry after her appearance in the film Kabhie Tum Kabhie Hum.

Career
Kulkarni made her film debut with the 1992 movie Tirangaa (film). In 1993, she starred in Aashiq Awara, which won her a Filmfare Award for Lux New Face of the Year. She went on to appear in many popular films such as Waqt Hamara Hai (1993), Krantiveer (1994), Karan Arjun (1995), Sabse Bada Khiladi (1995) and Baazi (1995). She mostly played the leading actor's love interest in all these films.

Things changed when Rajkumar Santoshi, in whose earlier movie Ghatak: Lethal (1996) she had a cameo appearance in a song, cast her as the female lead in his 1998 movie China Gate, an ambitious remake of Seven Samurai. However, things did not go as planned. Relations between Santoshi and the actress soured. Rumours began circulating that Kulkarni had been dropped from the movie, and was reinstated only after gangster Chhota Rajan intervened on her behalf. When the movie was finally released, it was an average earner. Furthermore, the only song in the movie, the item number "Chamma Chamma", was picturised on Urmila Matondkar, even though Kulkarni had built her reputation with such numbers. To add insult to injury, the song turned out to be a chartbuster, which greatly increased Matondkar's popularity.

Angered and frustrated at the turn of events, Kulkarni lashed out at Santoshi, accusing him of cutting her screen time because she had refused his advances. Santoshi denied all rumours related to the movie, and the matter was given a quiet burial. However, this proved to be the death blow to Kulkarni's career. She only appeared in a handful of movies after that, and new offers dried up. Her last successful film was Chhupa Rustam: A Musical Thriller (2001). She quit movies after the 2002 film Kabhie Tum Kabhie Hum. She also did a few movies in Kannada, Tamil, Telugu, Bengali and Malayalam.

Personal life
Kulkarni belonged to a middle class Marathi  Brahmin family and claims that she was not married to Vicky Goswami. However, contrary reports state that she married Vicky Goswami in 2013.

Controversy
In June 2016, the Thane Police named Kulkarni as one of the accused involved in supplying ephedrine for illicit manufacture of methamphetamine to a 2000 crore international drug racket and gangster, intended for trafficking. It is alleged that Kulkarni along with her partner Vicky Goswami and other co-accused attended a meeting in an international drug ring in Kenya in January 2016.

The crime branch of Thane police, which is investigating an international ephedrine supply racket, on 25 June 2017 issued a notice of 'proclaimed offender' to her and her partner and alleged drug lord Vicky Goswami. A team of crime branch officials went to Kulkarni's house at Sky Enclave in Versova, suburban Mumbai, and pasted a notice on the door, as the actress' whereabouts are not known. A special Narcotic Drugs and Psychotropic Substances (NDPS) Act court declared Kulkarni and Goswami as proclaimed offenders and ordered attachment of their properties.

Filmography

References

External links

Living people
20th-century Indian actresses
Marathi people
1972 births
Actresses in Hindi cinema
Indian film actresses
Actresses from Mumbai
21st-century Indian actresses
Actresses in Bengali cinema
Actresses in Kannada cinema
Actresses in Telugu cinema
Actresses in Malayalam cinema
Actresses in Tamil cinema
Filmfare Awards winners